A by-election for the seat of Blain in the Northern Territory Legislative Assembly was held on 12 April 2014. The by-election was triggered by the resignation of Country Liberal Party (CLP) member and former Northern Territory Chief Minister Terry Mills. Mills resigned in reaction to being removed as CLP leader and Chief Minister in March 2013 in a party room coup by Adam Giles. The CLP margin in the Palmerston-based seat was 13.2 points.

On 3 April 2014, a week after the writ was issued for the by-election, three indigenous CLP MPs resigned from the party and moved to the crossbench.  Had the CLP failed to hold Blain, it would have been reduced to a minority government and would have needed the support of at least one of the four independents to stay in office.  Although Blain was a comfortably safe CLP seat on paper, the average swing against governments at by-elections in greater Darwin/Palmerston was 12 per cent.

An NT News face-to-face poll of 200 voters in Blain took place from 8 to 10 April which indicated a 12-point swing away from the CLP.

Candidates
The five candidates in ballot paper order were:

Results

A recheck of all election night counts was conducted on Sunday 13 April, and early distribution of preferences was carried out on Tuesday 15 April. Final vote figures were published by NTEC on the evening of 22 April—the deadline for arrival of postal votes.

The CLP claimed victory on election night, with the night's count indicating they had retained the seat by a 3.2 per cent margin on a two-party-preferred basis, with a 10 per cent swing against them. The official declaration of the poll took place on the morning of Wednesday 16 April 2014.
Despite coming close to winning the seat, Bahnert was not again the ALP candidate for Blain at the 2016 election.

See also
List of Northern Territory by-elections

References

External links
2014 Blain by-election: Antony Green ABC
2014 Blain by-election: NTEC

2014 elections in Australia
Northern Territory by-elections
2010s in the Northern Territory